Antarctobacter heliothermus is a Gram-negative, aerobic, pointed and budding bacteria, the type species of its genus. Its type strain is EL-219T(= DSM 11445T).

References

Further reading
Holt, John G., et al. "Bergey’s manual of determinative bacteriology." Baltimore, MD 152 (1994).

External links

LPSN
WORMS
Type strain of Antarctobacter heliothermus at BacDive -  the Bacterial Diversity Metadatabase

Rhodobacteraceae
Bacteria described in 1998